Conrad Meyer (1618 Zürich – 1689 Zürich) was a painter, engraver, and medallist of Zürich.

He was a student of Matthäus Merian. 
He was successful as a painter of portrait and landscapes, but later specialized on copper engraving, producing more than a thousand works. 
He also produced the map of Switzerland by Conrad Gyger (1657) and a Planisphaerium Coeleste (1681).

His son Johannes Meyer (1655–1712) was also a painter and engraver.

References

External links

Conrad Meyer: Planisphaerium Coeleste. Zürich 1681.

worldcat.org

Swiss engravers
Baroque printmakers
17th-century Swiss painters
Swiss male painters
1618 births
1689 deaths
17th-century engravers
Artists from Zürich